Adolfo Figueroa-Viñas, Ph.D. is the first Puerto Rican astrophysicist at the National Aeronautics and Space Administration (NASA) and is an expert in solar and space plasma physics at the Heliophysics Science Division. As a staff scientist his research interests include studying plasma kinetic physics and magnetohydrodynamics of the solar wind, heliosphere, shock waves, MHD and kinetic simulation of plasma instabilities, and turbulent processes associated with space, solar and astrophysical plasmas.

Early years
Viñas was born in Arecibo, Puerto Rico. He studied at the University of Puerto Rico-R.U.M. where he received a B.S. and M.S. in physics in 1970 and 1972, respectively. He later studied at the Massachusetts Institute of Technology (MIT), where he received a Ph.D. in physics in 1980. Between 1970 and 1974, he worked as an instructor and assistant professor of physics at the University of Puerto Rico. He joined Goddard Space Flight Center in 1980, where he has held multiple positions. He currently is a staff scientist in the Geospace Physics Laboratory of the Heliophysics Science Division at Goddard. He has served as Adjunct Visiting Physics Professor at the Universidad de Concepcion (Chile), at the Universidade do Estado do Rio de Janeiro (Brazil), and at the Universidad de Alcalá de Henáres-Madrid (Spain).

NASA
Viñas has pioneered methods for the analysis of plasma particle detectors on board spacecraft. He has conceived and developed a technique for the determination of the fluid moments of velocity distribution function in space plasma measurements from particle detectors. This method is currently being tested for implementation on board any satellite CPU processing unit with particle detectors, to reduce the amount of data required to compute the moments on ground with only a small amount of measurements required via telemetry to unpack the physical quantities on ground. Viñas has also pioneer work to resolve the geometrical properties, propagation velocity, and characteristics of shock waves from simple conservation principles. His work has received national and international recognition (known as the Viñas-Scudder Method) because it is the most accurate and robust method for in-situ shock characteristics determination from space plasma measurements. The Viñas-Scudder method have been implemented into an Interactive Data Language (IDL) visualization tool named SDAT (Shock and Discontinuities Analysis Tool) for distribution to the scientific community and investigators interested in shock physics.

Currently
Viñas is a staff astrophysicist at the Geospace Physics Laboratory of the Heliophysics Science Division at the NASA Goddard Space Flight Center. Viñas continues actively in research and lecturing at various national and international research centers and universities, He is also a post-doctoral mentor and adviser to many national and international young scientists. He is currently an active member of the American Physical Society (APS), the American Geophysical Union (AGU), and a founding member of the Latin American Association for Space Geophysics (ALAGE).

Selected publications

See also

List of Puerto Ricans
Puerto Rican scientists and inventors
University of Puerto Rico at Mayaguez people
List of Puerto Ricans in the United States Space Program

References

External links
Adolfo Figueroa-Viñas profile (archived version) at NASA.gov

Living people
Massachusetts Institute of Technology School of Science alumni
NASA people
People from Arecibo, Puerto Rico
Puerto Rican scientists
University of Puerto Rico alumni
1949 births